Listracanthus is a genus of extinct chondrichthyan with uncertain affinities.  Species of Listracanthus are known primarily from their tremendous, feather-like denticles, which range up to four inches in length.  The denticles had a large main spine, from which secondary spines emanate from the sides, like the barbs of a feather or a comb.  Listracanthus first appeared in late Carboniferous strata in North America, and eventually disappear from the fossil record some time during the Early Triassic.
 
The appearance of these sharks are largely unknown.  However, author and illustrator Ray Troll mentions in his book, Sharkabet, about how paleontologist Rainer Zangerl once discovered a large shale slab containing a long, eel-like fish covered in long, spine-like denticles characteristic of the genus, only to have it dry out and crumble into dust.  As such, according to Zangerl's account, Troll reconstructs Listracanthus as resembling a tremendous, fiercely bristled frill shark.

Martill et al., (2014) created the genus Acanthorhachis for the species formerly known as "Listracanthus" spinatus (Bolton, 1896). They also erected the family Listracanthidae to encompass the two genera.

References

Prehistoric fish of North America
Prehistoric cartilaginous fish genera
Carboniferous cartilaginous fish
Permian cartilaginous fish
Triassic cartilaginous fish
Pennsylvanian first appearances
Early Triassic extinctions